Paranephelius is a genus of South American plants in the tribe Liabeae within the family Asteraceae.

 Species
 Paranephelius asperifolius (Muschl.) H.Rob. & Brettell - Bolivia, Salta
 Paranephelius bullatus A.Gray ex Wedd. - Huánuco
 Paranephelius ferreyrii H.Rob. - Cajamarca, La Libertad
 Paranephelius jelskii (Hieron.) H.Rob. & Brettell - Peru
 Paranephelius ovatus A.Gray ex Wedd. - Bolivia, Peru
 Paranephelius uniflorus Poepp. - Bolivia, Peru, Ecuador
 Paranephelius wurdackii H.Rob. - Peruvian Amazonas, Cajamarca

References

Asteraceae genera
Liabeae
Flora of South America
Taxa named by Eduard Friedrich Poeppig